The 1997 Norwest Sun Bowl featured the Iowa Hawkeyes and the Arizona State Sun Devils.

After a scoreless first quarter, Arizona State scored first, with a 35-yard touchdown pass from quarterback Steve Campbell to wide receiver Lenzie Jackson to give ASU an early 7–0 lead. Kicker Robert Nycz kicked a 20-yard field goal to increase the lead to 10–0.

In the third quarter, running back Michael Martin scored on a 1-yard touchdown run to give ASU a 17–0 lead. In the fourth quarter, quarterback Randy Reiners threw a 26-yard touchdown pass to wide receiver Richard Carter.

Teams
The game was played between the Iowa Hawkeyes from the Big Ten Conference and the Arizona State Sun Devils from the Pac-10 Conference. This was the first overall meeting and first postseason meeting between the programs.

Iowa Hawkeyes

Iowa entered the game with a 7–4 record (4–4 in conference). After lofty preseason expectations, they finished tied for sixth place in the Big Ten standings. The Hawkeyes went 1–2 versus the ranked teams they faced; losing at Ohio State and at Michigan in consecutive weeks before defeating Purdue at Kinnick Stadium.

Arizona State Sun Devils

Arizona entered the game with a 8–3 record (6–2 in conference). They finished in third place in the Pac-10 Conference standings. The Sun Devils were 3–1 against ranked opponents, defeating Miami (FL), Stanford, and Washington State while losing to Washington. They started their season 3–2, then won five in a row before finishing the regular season with a loss to rival Arizona.

References

External links
 USA Today recap of game

Sun Bowl
Sun Bowl
Arizona State Sun Devils football bowl games
Iowa Hawkeyes football bowl games
December 1997 sports events in the United States
1997 in sports in Texas